Mark Corcoran (born 30 November 1980) is a Scottish former professional footballer, who played for Hamilton Academical, St Mirren, Partick Thistle, Ross County, Stenhousemuir and Stranraer. He played in midfield, left wing and in attack.

Career
Corcoran began his career at junior side Tayport before moving to Linlithgow Rose.

Corcoran, who previously played for Hamilton Academical joined St Mirren in 2005 on a free transfer. He made 39 league appearances for the Buddies, before signing a pre-contract with former club Accies on 28 April 2008.

On 28 July 2009 Corcoran signed for Partick Thistle but his contract was cancelled by mutual consent at the end of the season. Corcoran joined Ross County a few days later.

On 25 January 2013 Corcoran joined Stenhousemuir on loan until the end of the season. For the 2013/14 season he signed to play for Stranraer.

Honours
St Mirren
Scottish Challenge Cup: 2005–06

References

External links

1980 births
Hamilton Academical F.C. players
Scottish Junior Football Association players
Living people
Footballers from Perth, Scotland
Scottish Football League players
Scottish footballers
Scottish Premier League players
St Mirren F.C. players
Partick Thistle F.C. players
Association football wingers
Linlithgow Rose F.C. players
Ross County F.C. players
Stenhousemuir F.C. players
Stranraer F.C. players
Scottish Professional Football League players
Tayport F.C. players
Scotland junior international footballers